Thomas Fitch, V (1725 – January 16, 1795) was a member of the Connecticut House of Representatives from Norwalk in the sessions of October 1761, May and October 1763, May and October 1764, May and October 1765, May and October 1766, May 1767, October 1768, May and October 1769, October 1770, October 1771, October 1772, October 1773, October 1775, and May 1776.

He was the son of Governor Thomas Fitch, IV and Hannah Hall Fitch. He served as an officer in the French and Indian War, primarily in upstate New York, near Fort Crailo. Although he and his troops are widely believed to be the inspiration for the song Yankee Doodle, contemporary scholars now believe that its origins are at least twelve years earlier.

Yankee Doodle Legend 
There is a legend that during the French and Indian War, Fitch was the commander of four New England Regiments. Tradition states that Captain Fitch received the song in 1755 as a joke from British surgeon Dr. Richard Shuckburgh, making Fitch the original "Yankee Doodle".

Fitch's grave marker states that he is the inspiration for the song "Yankee Doodle."  The marker claims that Captain Fitch had assembled his company of recruits at the Fitch homestead in Norwalk at the beginning of the French and Indian War. His sister Elizabeth was concerned about the recruits' appearance and lack of uniforms, so she presented each man with a chicken feather for their hats that would present the image of uniformity. Their appearance when entering West Albany, with feathers in their hats and unpolished clothing, caused British surgeon Dr. Shuckburgh to write verses mocking Fitch and his men as "Yankee Doodles and Macaronies". However, the sentiment changed to become more favorable after the successful campaigns at Ticonderoga and Crown Point in 1759.

Fitch had the rank of Senior Colonel and was in command of sixteen regiments by the time that he had left the service three years later.

Life after military service 
After that conflict, Thomas, V returned to Norwalk. He was a prominent resident during and after the American Revolution. He served as a town councilman. He was, along with Thaddeus Betts, in the first delegation from Norwalk to the Connecticut House of Representatives in 1776. He helped with the reconstruction efforts after the burning of Norwalk in 1779.

He died on January 16, 1795, and was buried in the East Norwalk Historical Cemetery.

Historical dispute 
Norwalk historian, Gloria Stewart claims that eighteenth century documents available from the Connecticut state archives dispute the Yankee Doodle identity. One document is a bill for work copying and sending letters for the Connecticut General Assembly. The other is a 1775 document written by Fitch stating that he resigned his commission because of rheumatism that he had for twenty years.

In addition, no Thomas Fitch from Norwalk appears as a colonel  in the Rolls of Connecticut Men in the French and Indian War, 1755-1762.  There were only two regiments in June of 1755. Only Major General Phineas Lyman led more than a single regiment. Indeed, no Colonel appears to been sent from Norwalk in the war. The original Yankee Doodle song did not mention a pony, a feather or "Marconi", items which first appear in 1841 in a children's nursery version of the song.

References 

1725 births
1795 deaths
Burials in East Norwalk Historical Cemetery
Connecticut city council members
British military personnel of the French and Indian War
Members of the Connecticut House of Representatives
Politicians from Norwalk, Connecticut
People of Connecticut in the French and Indian War
British America army officers
Military personnel from Connecticut
18th-century American politicians